Music by Ry Cooder is a compilation album of Ry Cooder's soundtracks from movies released between 1980 and 1993. The movies and tracks on this album are:

 The Long Riders (1980) — The Long Riders, Archie's Funeral, Jesse James
 Southern Comfort (1981) — Theme from Southern Comfort, Swamp Walk, Canoes Upstream
 The Border (1982) — Across the Borderline, Highway 23, No Quiero, Maria
 Streets of Fire (1984) — Bomber Bash
 Paris, Texas (1984) — Paris, Texas; Cancion Mixteca; Houston in Two Seconds
 Alamo Bay (1985) — Theme from Alamo Bay, Klan Meeting
 Crossroads (1986) — See You in Hell, Blind Boy; Feelin' Bad Blues; Viola Lee Blues
 Blue City (1986) — Greenhouse, Nice Bike
 Johnny Handsome (1989) — I Like Your Eyes, Main Theme, Angola, Sunny's Tune, Cruising With Rafe, I Can't Walk This Time/The Prestige
 Trespass (1992) — King of the Street, East St. Louis, Goose and Lucky
 Geronimo: An American Legend (1993) — Goyakla Is Coming, Bound for Canaan (Sieber & Davis), Bound for Canaan (The 6th Cavalry), Train to Florida

Track listing
Tracks are from the CD. All songs by Ry Cooder, except where noted.

References

Ry Cooder albums
1995 albums